Within Subud, a "helper" (meaning “helping to train” or “assistant trainer") is a person who fills a certain support role. The nature of this role, and the actual performance of those who fill it, are subjects of some controversy within Subud.

Most Subud groups have helpers, who are responsible for assisting other members in various ways, as well as simply timing the latihan. Helpers exist at the local, regional, national, and international levels within the Subud organization.

Ideally, a helper should have at least seven years of practicing the latihan and be generally 'loved and respected' by their fellow members. One becomes a helper by asking the helpers to "test", or receive, whether the person has the capacity to fulfill the helper job at that point in time. That is, the helpers make a decision based on what they receive in their testing, and with as little mental thought and personal opinion as is humanly possible.

A focus of criticism is the role some helpers adopt as spiritual and personal counselors. Their ability and understanding apparently vary considerably. Reviewing the internet one can see a whole variety of balanced and not so balanced opinions of helpers. Helpers are as imperfect as the next person, and as is natural in any position of 'authority' interpersonal clashes involving helpers and other helpers and helpers and members do occur. There is no official training program nor set of predetermined skills necessary to become a Helper. Thus most Helpers, unless they have obtained training and licensure outside of the Subud organization in psychology, or behavioral health, or psychiatry, or other related career field, are thus untrained and unskilled.

According to the Subud USA National By-Laws (posted at www.subudusa.org), helpers serve six main functions. Note that these are the functions mentioned in the By-Laws, and that other functions are specified in other places, such as Bapak's "Advice and Guidance for Helpers" (see link below)):

Verify that members are active in the national (not-for-profit) organization, thereby giving membership status (Article 3, Section 1);
Removing membership status (Article 3, Section 2);
Reinstating membership status (Article 3, Section 3);
Supervising the national census (Article 5, Section 2);
Serving as members in standing national committees (Article 6, Section 6); and
Consulting with the National Board of Directors in certain situations regarding filling vacancies of the Officers of the Corporation (Article 7, Section 3).

Relationships between the Helpers (but not the duties and responsibilities of the Helpers) are dealt with in Article 11 of the By-Laws.

Officially, helpers are there to help Bapak, the founder of Subud, by supporting the Subud association in his absence. They have the responsibility to explain what Subud is to any interested person, to facilitate a person's first receiving (opening), and to serve members in deepening their receiving and applying it in their lives.Bapak has said frequently that being a helper is absolutely not a sign of spiritual superiority and that it is possible that some non-helpers are spiritually superior to the helpers. Similarly, there is no spiritual hierarchy of helpers: international helpers, national helpers and local helpers are simply designated as such for practical purposes.

Subud